George Claude Pimentel (May 2, 1922 – June 18, 1989) was the inventor of the chemical laser. He also developed the technique of matrix isolation in low-temperature chemistry. In theoretical chemistry, he proposed the three-center four-electron bond which is now accepted as the best simple model of hypervalent molecules. In the late 1960s, Pimentel led the University of California team that designed the infrared spectrometer for the Mars Mariner 6 and 7 missions that analyzed the surface and atmosphere of Mars.

An alumnus of University of California, Los Angeles (B.S. 1943) and University of California, Berkeley (Ph.D. 1949), Pimentel began teaching at Berkeley in 1949, where he remained until his death in 1989 from intestinal cancer, with a stint in Washington at the National Science Foundation under the Carter administration.

Honors and awards
The ACS Award in Chemical Education was renamed the George C. Pimentel Award in Chemical Education in his honor in 1989.

Earle K. Plyler Prize for Molecular Spectroscopy (1979)
Wolf Prize in Chemistry (1982)
Peter Debye Award (1983)
National Medal of Science (1985)
Franklin Medal (1985)
Welch Award (1986)
American Institute of Chemists Gold Medal (1988)
Priestley Medal (1989)
George C. Pimentel Award in Chemical Education (1990)

Chemical laser 
In 1961, John C.Polanyi was the first to point out the possibility of chemical pumping based on vibrational excitation. He proposed four possible reactions, one of which was the reaction of H + Cl2. Using an infrared spectrometer, Jerome Kasper and Pimentel discovered infrared pulses produced by photodissociation of iodine, the first chemical laser. In September 1964, they announced their discovery at the first conference on chemical lasers, by that time more than 100 possible chemical reactions and 60 photodissociation reactions were proposed capable of producing laser radiation. However, at the symposium in San Diego only one working laser was reported, which was laced with photodissociation of iodine. In 1965, Kasper and Pimentel discovered the laser radiation HCl, arising from the explosion of the system H2 / Cl2. After the discovery of the laser based on the reaction of F + H2 in 1967, the number of chemical lasers found by the Pimentel laboratory rapidly increased. Thus, Pimentel first transformed the chemical energy obtained as a result of vibrational excitation into laser radiation.

In 1966, when the work on the chemical laser was actively carried out, Pimentel was elected to the National Academy of Sciences and in 1968 to the American Academy of Arts and Science. In 1985, 1987 and 1989 he was elected an honorary member to the American Philosophical Society, the Royal Chemical Society (Great Britain), and the Royal Institute of Great Britain.

References

External links
 

Guide to the George C. Pimentel Papers at The Bancroft Library

1922 births
1989 deaths
National Medal of Science laureates
Presidents of the American Chemical Society
Spectroscopists
University of California, Los Angeles alumni
Wolf Prize in Chemistry laureates
University of California, Berkeley faculty
Scientists from the San Francisco Bay Area
Fellows of the American Physical Society